Route 259 is a north–south highway on the south shore of the St. Lawrence River in Quebec, Canada. Its northern terminus is in Nicolet at the junction of Route 132 and its southern terminus is in Notre-Dame-du-Bon-Conseil at the junction of Route 122.

Municipalities along Route 259
 Nicolet
 Sainte-Monique
 Sainte-Perpétue
 Notre-Dame-du-Bon-Conseil

See also
 List of Quebec provincial highways

References

External links
 Route 259 on Google Maps
 Provincial Route Map (Courtesy of the Quebec Ministry of Transportation) 

259